Gai Zhixin is
Board Chairman and Party Secretary of China International Travel Corp Limited,
Board Chairman and General Manager of the CITS Group Corporation,
and Chairman of China Association of Travel Service (CATS).
He was President and General Manager of China Duty-Free Goods Group Company.
He is also a member of the Steering Committee of the China-United States Exchange Foundation,
Honorary Advisor of the Global Tourism Economy Forum.

References 

Living people
Beijing International Studies University people
Year of birth missing (living people)